Psilocybe mesophylla is a species of psilocybin mushroom in the family Hymenogastraceae. Found in Oaxaca, Mexico, where it grows on bare clay soil, it was described as new to science in 2004.

See also
List of psilocybin mushrooms
List of Psilocybe species

References

External links

Entheogens
Fungi described in 2004
Psychoactive fungi
mesophylla
Psychedelic tryptamine carriers
Fungi of Mexico
Taxa named by Gastón Guzmán
Fungi without expected TNC conservation status